Guangdong-Hong Kong Cup 2005–06 is the 28th staging of this two-leg competition between Hong Kong and Guangdong.

The first leg was played in Mong Kok Stadium in Hong Kong on 31 December 2005 while the second leg was played in Guangzhou on 8 January 2006.

Guangdong captured champion by winning an aggregate 2–1 against Hong Kong.

Squads

Hong Kong
The team consists of 18 players:

Guangdong
Manager:  Drago Mamić

Fixtures
First Leg

Second Leg

References
 HKFA Website 香港 對 廣東﹝1：0﹞(in chinese)
 HKFA Website 廣東 對 香港﹝0：2﹞(in chinese)

 

2006
2005 in Chinese football
2006 in Chinese football
2005–06 in Hong Kong football